The THL Simplified Phonetic Transcription of Standard Tibetan (or THL Phonetic Transcription for short) is a system for the phonetic rendering of the Tibetan language.

It was created by David Germano and Nicolas Tournadre and was published on 12 December 2003. It is essentially a simplified form of the Tournadre Phonetic System, which is used by Tournadre in his Tibetan-language textbooks.

THL (formerly THDL) stands for the "Tibetan and Himalayan Library" project, which is hosted at the University of Virginia.

Overview

Onsets

Vowels

Notes

References

External links 
 The Transliteration and Transcription of Tibetan (Tibetan & Himalayan Library)
 THL Simplified Phonetic Transcription of Standard Tibetan
 THL Extended Wylie Transliteration of Tibetan

Tibet
Romanization of Tibetan